Nestor Kombot-Naguemon (November 14, 1934 – October 26, 2004) was a politician and diplomat of the Central African Republic. He served as minister of foreign affairs in 1969–70. In 1991, he founded the Liberal Democratic Party (PLD).

1934 births
2004 deaths
People from Yaoundé
Foreign ministers of the Central African Republic
Government ministers of the Central African Republic
Ambassadors of the Central African Republic to West Germany
Politicians who committed suicide
Ambassadors of the Central African Republic to France